Ka-Yeon Lee (born in Seoul, Korea in 1992) is a South Korean violinist.

Background
Lee was three years old when she realized she wanted to play violin and began playing the following year on an instrument her parents purchased for her. To help her realize her dream, Lee's parents relocated from South Korea to the United States. In November 2008, then 16, Lee was featured along with other young musicians on National Public Radio's "From the Top".

References

1992 births
Living people
South Korean emigrants to the United States
South Korean violinists
21st-century violinists